Jutta Behrendt ( Hampe; 15 November 1960 in Berlin) is a German competition rower, world champion and Olympic champion.

Hampe competed for the SC Dynamo Berlin / Sportvereinigung (SV) Dynamo and received a gold medal in single sculls at the 1988 Summer Olympics in Seoul. In October 1986, she was awarded a Star of People's Friendship in gold (second class) for her sporting success.

In the 1987 season, Hampe was displaced from the single scull by Martina Schröter who had returned after a break. Hampe joined the quad scull team, herself having replaced Kerstin Hinze. She competed under her maiden name until the end of the 1987 rowing season and had married by mid-October 1987. Her husband, Dirk Behrendt, is a rowing trainer.

References

External links
 

1960 births
Living people
People from East Berlin
Rowers from Berlin
East German female rowers
Olympic rowers of Germany
Olympic gold medalists for East Germany
Rowers at the 1988 Summer Olympics
Olympic medalists in rowing
World Rowing Championships medalists for East Germany
Medalists at the 1988 Summer Olympics
Recipients of the Patriotic Order of Merit in gold